R366 road may refer to:
 R366 road (Ireland)
 R366 road (South Africa)